West Muna Regency is a new regency of Southeast Sulawesi, Indonesia, established under Act No.14 of 2014, dated 23 July 2014 by separation from the Muna Regency. It covers an area of 906.28 km2, and the districts comprising it had a population of 71,632 at the 2010 Census; the 2020 Census resulted in a population of 84,590, and the official estimate as at mid 2021 was 84,777, comprising 41,888 males and 42,889 females.The administrative centre lies at Laworo.

Administrative districts
The West Muna Regency is divided into eleven districts (kecamatan), tabulated below with their areas and their populations at the 2010 Census and the 2020 Census, together with the official estimates as at mid 2021. The table also includes the locations of the district headquarters, the number of administrative villages (rural desa and urban kelurahan) in each district, and its post code.

Notes:
 (a) Tiworo Kepulauan District includes 4 small islands off the north coast of Muna, but lies mainly on Muna Island.
 (b) Maginto District includes 7 small islands off the west coast of Muna.
 (c) Tiworo Tengah District includes some small islands off the west coast of Muna.
 (d) Tiworo Utara District consists mainly of a group of 12 islands off the northwest coast of Muna, but also includes a small northwesterly part of Muna island itself (Tondasi Village, covering 17.65 km2, with 779 inhabitants in 2020).

References

External links
 

Regencies of Southeast Sulawesi
2014 establishments in Indonesia